Jungle Fish is a 2008 South Korean youth television special starring Kim Soo-hyun and Park Bo-young. Based on a true story, the drama depicts the pressures placed on students to achieve and gain admission to prestigious colleges and universities. Also, it showcased new interactive blogging. The series marked Kim's first official lead role. It aired on KBS2 on 5 May 2008 at 19:20 (KST), and is available for worldwide streaming through KBS World's official YouTube channel.

The special recorded a viewership rating of 3.3%. It received critical acclaim for filming and editing, and acting by a cast of young performers winning numerous awards, including the Peabody Award. It became the KBS show with the most international awards in history.

It was given a theatrical screening on 23 September 2010 at the Lotte Cinema at Konkuk University. A television series, Jungle Fish 2, was created featuring a different cast, and aired in 2010 on KBS.

Summary
The drama Jungle Fish, which means a fish that lived on the coast of Africa and fell into the jungle by a whirlwind, portrays the current youth (fish) who are struggling for the better future (beach) while suffering from the reality (jungle) of the entrance exam.

The story is about high school students around Han Jae-ta (Kim Soo-hyun) who share their concerns and problems through the blog. One day, an examination paper leak incident occurs at his school through special tutoring. The class leader leads Jae-ta and digs into the problem to confirm "Who is the protagonist of the incident?", and the incident is gradually amplified through Jae-ta's blog. Through this incident, Jae-ta and his friends are increasingly in conflict and skepticism about "the value of friendship and success."

Cast

Main 
Kim Soo-hyun as Han Jae-ta
 A high-school student, who has good photography skills and runs a blog about his daily life. 
Park Bo-young as Lee Eun-soo
 Her mother wants her to enroll in a prestigious college. She unburdens her daily life problems through the blog.

Supporting 
Hwang Chan-sung as Park Young-sam
 Jae-ta's friend who leads him to find out who stole the exam question papers.
Jang Ki-bum as Han Dong-hee
 Jae-ta's friend who comes in skepticism about the friendship with him after the incident.
Cha Min-ji as Kang-sol
 Eun-soo's good friend who refuses to talk with her after learning the truth.
Seo Hye-jin as Na Mi-rae
 Eun-soo's classmate who takes special classes with her and Dong-hee.
Kim C as Jae-ta's uncle
Kim Dong-beom as speaker

Awards

References

External links 
Jungle Fish official KBS website 

2008 South Korean television series debuts
Korean Broadcasting System television dramas
Korean-language television shows
South Korean teen dramas
2008 South Korean television series endings